Gadilida is an order of very small tusk shells, marine scaphopod molluscs.

The species within the Gadilida are usually very much smaller than those within the other order of scaphopods, the Dentaliida.

Families
Families within the order Gadilida:
 Entalinidae Chistikov, 1979
 Gadilidae Stoliczka, 1868
 Pulsellidae Scarabino in Boss, 1982
 Wemersoniellidae Scarabino, 1986
 Unassigned:
 Boissevainia V. Scarabino & F. Scarabino, 2010
 Compressidens Pilsbry & Sharp, 1897
 Megaentalina Habe, 1963

References
 Scarabino, V. (1995). Scaphopoda of the tropical Pacific and Indian Oceans, with description of 3 new genera and 42 new species. in: Bouchet, P. (Ed.) Résultats des Campagnes MUSORSTOM 14. Mémoires du Muséum national d'Histoire naturelle. Série A, Zoologie. 167: 189-379.

 

Scaphopods